Mafu may refer to:

 Khwezi Mafu (born 1998), South African rugby player
 Kibonge Mafu (born 1945), Congolese football player
 Nocawe Mafu, South African politician
 Ma Fu, or Mafu, a 3rd-century B.C. district of China administered by the bureaucrat Zhao She

See also
 Mǎ Fù, in Chinese constellations, one of the Southern Asterisms